James Bigden (1880 – after 1910) was an English association footballer who played as a wing half. Bigden featured with clubs Thames Ironworks,  Gravesend United, West Ham United, Arsenal, Bury and Southend United.

Playing career

Born in Poplar, London, Bigden began his footballing career aged 13 with Old St Lukes where he remained until the beginning of the 1899–1900 season when he joined local team, Thames Ironworks. Described as a hard working half-back he played 11 times in the Southern League and twice in the FA Cup for the Ironworks. The following season Thames Ironworks folded to later become West Ham United. Bigden joined Gravesend United where he played 26 games scoring a single goal. West Ham re-signed him for the 1901–02 season making his debut on 7 September 1901 in a 2–0 away defeat of Bristol Rovers. He played for West Ham for the next three seasons amassing 91 league games, scoring three times. He also played five FA Cup games for them.

In 1904 he joined Woolwich Arsenal, this time playing in the First Division of the Football League. He was a regular in the Arsenal side and helped them reach 7th in the First Division in season 1906–07.
Four seasons with Arsenal saw him play 87 games in all including 75 league games scoring a single goal. On 27 June 1908 he moved north and signed for Bury where he made only three appearances before moving south to Southend United. Now playing back in the Southern League, Bigden made only four appearances for Southend before his footballing career ended.

References

1880 births
Year of death missing
Footballers from Poplar, London
English footballers
Association football defenders
Thames Ironworks F.C. players
Gravesend United F.C. players
West Ham United F.C. players
Arsenal F.C. players
Southend United F.C. players
Bury F.C. players
English Football League players
Southern Football League players